First Legion may refer to:

 The First Legion (1951 film) U.S. drama film
 Legio I (Ancient Rome), see List of Roman legions
 Legio I Adiutrix
 Legio I Armeniaca
 Legio I Germanica
 Legio I Iovia
 Legio I Isaura Sagittaria
 Legio I Italica
 Legio I Macriana liberatrix
 Legio I Maximiana
 Legio I Minervia
 Legio I Parthica
 1st Legion Tercio "Great Captain Gonzalo Fernández de Córdoba", an infantry regiment in the Spanish Legion
 1st Legions Infantry Division (Poland), an infantry division in the Polish army
 1st Brigade, Polish Legions, an infantry brigade in the Austro-Hungarian army